Stephen Kulik (August 3, 1950 – December 18, 2022) was an American politician who represented the 1st Franklin District in the Massachusetts House of Representatives from 1993 to 2019, was a member of the Worthington, Massachusetts Board of Selectmen from 1983 to 1994, and was a Hampshire County Commissioner from 1989 to 1992.

In 2018, Kulik did not run for re-election. The seat was won by fellow Democrat Natalie Blais.

References

1956 births
Democratic Party members of the Massachusetts House of Representatives
People from Franklin County, Massachusetts
County commissioners in Massachusetts
Northeastern University alumni
University of Massachusetts Amherst alumni
Living people
21st-century American politicians
People from Worthington, Massachusetts